The 1970 Hawaii Rainbows football team represented the University of Hawaiʻi at Mānoa as an independent during the 1970 NCAA College Division football season. In their third season under head coach Dave Holmes, the Rainbows compiled a 9–2 record.

Guard Jim Kalill received second-team honors on the 1970 Little All-America college football team.

Schedule

References

Hawaii
Hawaii Rainbow Warriors football seasons
Hawaii Rainbows football